Karol Hoffmann (10 August 1913 – 28 February 1971) was a Polish athlete. He competed in the men's triple jump and the men's high jump at the 1936 Summer Olympics.

References

External links
 

1913 births
1971 deaths
People from Szamotuły County
Sportspeople from Greater Poland Voivodeship
Athletes (track and field) at the 1936 Summer Olympics
Polish male triple jumpers
Polish male high jumpers
Olympic athletes of Poland